Vietnam faces a concentrated HIV epidemic.

Reporting
HIV prevalence data in Vietnam is based primarily on HIV/AIDS case reporting and on the HIV Sentinel Surveillance conducted annually in 40 of Vietnam's 64 provinces. The government now reports HIV cases in all provinces, 93 percent of all districts, and 49 percent of all communes, although many high prevalence provinces report cases in 100 percent of communes. Even though Vietnam has implemented HIV/AIDS case reporting, the general lack of HIV testing thus far suggests that the actual number of people living with HIV/AIDS is much higher.

Current state

The first HIV case was detected in 1990. The estimated number of people living with HIV then rose drastically from 3,000 in 1992 to 220,000 in 2007, and is projected to be 280,000 in 2012. Among these, 5,670 are children. According to the IMF, this trend is placing Vietnam at the threshold of moving the disease from the high-risk groups of drug users and sex workers to the general population.  Among those who inject drugs, 19% are infected by HIV (up to 30% in some provinces).

Injection of drugs

Injecting drug users (IDU) account for up to 65% of people living with HIV. The HIV prevalence among male IDU is estimated to be 23.1%. Drug injection is reported as the major cause for doubling the number of HIV/AIDS patients from 2000 to 2005.

Although there appears widespread awareness of using sterile needles among IDU (88% reported doing so in the last injection) sharing needles is common among those who have already contracted HIV/AIDS. In a survey of 20 provinces in Vietnam, 35% of IDU living with HIV shared needles and syringes. Besides, IDU often engage in risky sexual behaviours. 25% of male IDU in Hanoi is reported to buy sex and do not use condoms. Meanwhile, female IDU often sell sex to finance their drug need. This raises the risk of spreading HIV/AIDS to the general population.

Sexual transmission

Another main cause of HIV/AIDS spread is sexual transmission through the sex workers. While 97.1% of female sex workers (FSW) reported using condoms with their most recent clients, the rate is much lower at 41.1% among those who are living with HIV.

Others

While HIV/AIDS remain an epidemic only within the high-risk groups, women in the general population may be more exposed to the risk of contracting HIV than reported. One study estimates that reported HIV transmission among women may reflect as low as 16% of the real number due to the lack of HIV screening. The number of women with HIV infection is estimated to increase from less than 30,000 in 2000 to 90,000 in 2007.

Women may contract HIV/AIDS through partners who are undisclosed IDU. Men having pre-marital or extra-marital sexual relationships with FSW inevitably expose their wives to HIV/AIDS risk. Particularly in provinces with mobile populations, migrant husbands who, being away from home, are likely buy sex and use drugs may contract HIV and transmit to their wives.

With potentially high HIV prevalence among women, perinatal transmission presents another channel of HIV transmission. It is reported that more than 1% of pregnant women in some provinces are found HIV positive.

Challenges

Social stigma against HIV/AIDS patients presents a major obstacle to contain HIV/AIDS. HIV/AIDS patients are treated unequally in the hospitals and denied employment. Children with HIV are not welcomed in school. In 2009, parents in Ho Chi Minh City forced officials to expel children with HIV. Discrimination thus discourages people to go for screening or to take medication in fear of revealing their HIV status.

Funding for HIV/AIDS programmes in Vietnam is another pressing issue limiting the success of the effort to control the disease. Over the past 5 years, the available resource covered merely 50% of the demand. Moreover, since 70% of this amount was received from international institutions while state funding accounted for only 13%, there is no guarantee of future availability.

The final challenge lies in the limited human resources. There is a shortage of helpers in provincial and district areas. Currently, there are approximately 1,300 health workers in preventive medicines nationwide, including anti-HIV work, or 21 on average for each city or district. Dr. Nguyen Thanh Long, Chief of the Health Ministry's HIV/AIDS Control Department, estimated that Vietnam has to increase the number of health workers to 20,000 by 2020 in order to be able to contain and reduce the increasing number of infected cases.

References

Vietnam
Health in Vietnam